During the 1993–94 English football season, Oldham Athletic competed in the FA Premier League.

Season summary
Oldham Athletic's luck finally ran out on the final day of the season as their failure to beat Norwich City condemned them to relegation after three years in the top flight. A year earlier, they had won their final three games of the season to stay up on goal difference and, this time round, they had looked more than capable of beating the drop without needing any last-gasp "Houdini" survival acts. They even looked on course for their first-ever FA Cup final as they entered the final minute of the semi-final beating Manchester United 1–0.

But Mark Hughes then equalised for United and forced a replay, in which a visibly downbeat Latics were crushed 4–1 at Maine Road. The team seemed to lose its fighting spirit in the final weeks of the season, and the results of other relegation-threatened teams would have sent them down even if they had managed to beat Norwich on that final day.

Yet there was no pressure for manager Joe Royle, the longest-serving manager in any division, to be removed from his position. The board kept faith in him and he kept faith in his players, with Mike Milligan (to Norwich) being the only significant departure of the close season.

The season had started dismally with a 3–0 home defeat to Ipswich Town, who would only narrowly avoid relegation at the end of the season after a decent start was followed by a slump. The next game saw Oldham win 1–0 at newly promoted Swindon Town, but then came a 10-match winless run which included five draws. The winless run ended on 30 October when a Darren Beckford goal gave them a 1–0 win at Chelsea. Three successive defeats followed before Oldham recorded their third league win of the campaign, a 2–1 home win over high flying Norwich City. There were a number of decent results after the turn of 1994, including two successive 2–1 home wins followed by a point at home to Leeds United. On 2 April, a 4–1 home win over Queen's Park Rangers suggested that the Latics were more than capable of survival. And they also had an FA Cup semi-final clash with Manchester United at Wembley to look forward to. First they had to meet United in the league at Old Trafford, and gave them a serious run for their money as the table-leading hosts managed a narrow 3–2 win. However, then came the semi-final, which went to a replay which the Latics lost, leaving them with Premier League survival to focus on. Three successive defeats did them no favours (a poor 2–1 home loss to West Ham United, a narrow 3–2 defeat at in-form Newcastle United - including two Oldham equalisers - and a 3–0 defeat at Wimbledon), and draws against the two Sheffield teams and a defeat at home to Tottenham Hotspur left them needing to beat Norwich City at Carrow Road on the final day of the season to stand any chance of survival. A 1–1 draw was not enough, and Oldham's three-year stay in the top flight was over.

Final league table

Results
Oldham Athletic's score comes first

Legend

FA Premier League

FA Cup

League Cup

First-team squad
Squad at end of season

Left club during season

Notes

References

Oldham Athletic
Oldham Athletic A.F.C. seasons